71-911 “City Star” is a Russian four-axle four-door single-sided tram with a completely low level floor, created by LLC “PC Transport Systems” at the facilities of Tver Carriage Works.

The first 100% low-floor tram car in the CIS. It is an analogue of planned 71-625 tram of Ust-Katav Wagon-Building Plant.

Operation by cities 
As of 2020, the City Star trams are operated in the following cities:

Modifications 
 71-911 — track gauge 1524 mm
 71-911E — Track gauge 1435 mm
71-911ЕМ «Lionet» — track gauge 1524 mm, updated

Participation in exhibitions
 Innoprom. July 9-12, 2014. (Ekaterinburg).
 ExpoCityTrans. October 29 - November 1, 2014. (Moscow)

References

External links
 71-911 tram description on official producer site.

Tram vehicles of Russia
Tver Carriage Works